This is a list of school districts in Rhode Island, sorted alphabetically.

Local

B

Barrington School District 
Burrillville School District

C

Central Falls School District
Chariho Regional School District
Coventry School District
Cranston School District
Cumberland School District

E

East Greenwich School District
East Providence School District

G
Glocester Elementary Schools

J
Jamestown School District
Johnston School District

L

Lincoln School District
Little Compton School District

M
Middletown School District

N

Narragansett School District
Newport School District
North Kingstown School District 
North Providence School District 
North Smithfield School District

P

Pawtucket School District
Portsmouth School District 
Providence School District

S

Scituate School District
Smithfield School District  
South Kingstown School District

T
Tiverton School District

W

Warwick School District
West Warwick School District
Westerly School District
Woonsocket School District

Regional

Bristol Warren Regional School District
Chariho Regional School District (serving Charlestown, Hopkinton and Richmond)
Exeter-West Greenwich Regional School District 
Foster-Glocester Regional School District 

School districts
Rhode Island
School districts